The 2014 Wisconsin–Whitewater Warhawks football team was an American football team that represented the University of Wisconsin–Whitewater as a member of the Wisconsin Intercollegiate Athletic Conference (WIAC) during the 2014 NCAA Division III football season. In their eighth and final season under head coach Lance Leipold, the Warhawks compiled a perfect 15–0 record and won the NCAA Division III national championship. It was Whitewater's sixth national championship in eight years.

Schedule

References

Wisconsin–Whitewater
Wisconsin–Whitewater Warhawks football seasons
NCAA Division III Football Champions
College football undefeated seasons
Wisconsin–Whitewater Warhawks football